The Scotland women's national cricket team, nicknamed the Wildcats, represents Scotland in international women's cricket. The team is organised by Cricket Scotland, an associate member of the International Cricket Council (ICC).

Scotland was involved in the first international women's cricket match, when they played against England in August 1932. The team played sporadically throughout the remainder of the 20th century, with regular competition beginning only in 2000. Scotland's first international tournament was the 2001 European Championship, where matches held One Day International (ODI) status. The team's only other ODI appearances to date came at the 2003 IWCC Trophy in the Netherlands, a qualifier for the 2005 World Cup. Outside regional tournaments, Scotland has only qualified for two major events since then – the 2008 World Cup Qualifier and the 2015 World Twenty20 Qualifier.

In April 2018, the ICC granted full Women's Twenty20 International (WT20I) status to all its members. Therefore, all Twenty20 matches played between Scotland women and another international side after 1 July 2018 will be a full WT20I. In May 2022, the ICC announced Scotland as one of five women's sides to gain ODI status.  Netherlands, Papua New Guinea, Thailand and the United States are the other four teams.

History
In , a Scottish women's team played England at New Road, Worcester, in what was the first international women's cricket fixture. Four members of the inaugural Scottish women's side – Betty Snowball, Myrtle Maclagan, Joy Liebert, and Betty Archdale – later played in Test matches for England. After 1932, a Scottish women's team was not raised again until 1979, when a fixture was played against a Junior England team at Malvern College, Worcestershire.

Scotland made their international tournament debut at the 2001 edition of the Women's European Championship. They lost all three games, finishing last in the four-team tournament. Two years later, they played in the 2003 IWCC Trophy, the inaugural edition of what is now known simply as the World Cup Qualifier. They finished fifth in the six-team tournament, which was hosted by the Netherlands, with their only win coming against Japan.

They again played in the European Championship in 2005, but again went without a win and finished last. In 2007 they will compete in the Women's World Cup qualifier in Ireland playing the hosts as well as Bermuda, the Netherlands, Papua New Guinea, Pakistan, South Africa and an African qualifier. The top two in this tournament will qualify for the World Cup in 2009, whilst the top four will gain Test and ODI status for the following four years.

In 2014, Scotland was promoted to Division 2 of the Women's County Championship after losing only one game throughout the season. The Wildcats are currently preparing for the ICC Women's World Twenty20 Qualifiers to be held in Thailand at the end of 2015.

In April 2018, Kathryn Bryce was named the captain of the team. In July 2018, Scotland played its first T20 international match against Uganda in the 2018 ICC Women's World Twenty20 Qualifier in the Netherlands.

In December 2020, the ICC announced the qualification pathway for the 2023 ICC Women's T20 World Cup. Scotland was named in the 2021 ICC Women's T20 World Cup Europe Qualifier regional group, alongside five other teams.

Mark Coles resigned as head coach in January 2022. He was replaced by Peter Ross on an interim basis in March 2022, through to the end of the 2022 ICC Women's T20 World Cup Qualifier in the UAE.

Tournament history

ICC Women's T20 World Cup Qualifier
 2015: 4th (DNQ)
 2018: 3rd (DNQ)
 2019: 5th (DNQ)
 2022: 6th (DNQ)

Commonwealth Games Qualifier
 2022: 3rd (DNQ)

European Championship

1989 to 1999: Did not participate
2001: 4th place
2005: 5th place
2007: 4th place
2012: 3rd place
2014: 3rd place
2016: 1st place

Records and statistics

International Match Summary — Scotland Women
 
Last updated 25 September 2022

Women's One Day International 

Highest team total: 142 v Japan, 25 July 2003 at Sportpark Klein Zwitserland, The Hague.
Highest individual innings: 46, Kari Anderson v Netherlands, 21 July 2003 at Sportpark Hofbrouckerlaan, Oegstgeest.
Best innings bowling: 4/25, Fiona Campbell v Japan, 25 July 2003 at Sportpark Klein Zwitserland, The Hague.

ODI record versus other nations

Records complete to Women ODI #449. Last updated 29 June 2019.

Women's Twenty20 International 

Highest team total: 172/4 v. the United Arab Emirates on 23 September 2022 at Tolerance Oval, Abu Dhabi.
Highest individual innings: 73*, Kathryn Bryce v. Netherlands on 7 September 2019 at Lochlands Park, Arbroath.
Best innings bowling: 5/3, Megan McColl v. France on 30 August 2021 at La Manga Club, Cartagena.

Most T20I runs for Scotland Women

Most T20I wickets for Scotland Women

T20I record versus other nations

Records complete to WT20I #1237. Last updated 25 September 2022.

''Note: Scotland won a Super Over after the tied match against Netherlands.

Current squad

The following players were picked for 2022 ICC Women's T20 World Cup Qualifier.

See also
 List of Scotland women ODI cricketers
 List of Scotland women Twenty20 International cricketers

References

Cricket
Women's national cricket teams
Women
Women's cricket in Scotland